A. J. "Peter" Kreis (January 19, 1900 – May 25, 1934) was an American racecar driver.  He and riding mechanic Robert Hahn were killed in a turn one accident while practicing for the 1934 Indianapolis 500.  As he was entering the turn, a car in front of him spun, followed by Kreis' car spinning, possibly due to trying to avoid a collision.  The car went over the outside wall backwards, tumbled, and hit a tree.  Both men were dead when the ambulance arrived.  Kreis was a wealthy contractor who took a month off each year to drive in the 500.

Indianapolis 500 results

See also
List of fatalities at the Indianapolis Motor Speedway

References

External links
Louis Meyer biography from the show "The Indy 500, a Race For Heroes" (requires download of software to watch) Kreis accident can be seen at approximately 8 minutes, 35 seconds in.

1900 births
1934 deaths
Sportspeople from Knoxville, Tennessee
Racing drivers from Tennessee
Indianapolis 500 drivers
AAA Championship Car drivers
Racing drivers who died while racing
Sports deaths in Indiana